In Korean cuisine, ugeoji is outer leaves or stems of cabbage, radish, and other greens, which are removed while trimming the vegetables.

Ugeoji is often used in soups and stews, including haejang-guk (hangover soup).

Gallery

See also 
 Siraegi – dried radish greens

References 

Food ingredients
Korean cuisine